Jay Shambhu is a 2022 Indian Bhojpuri language action romance drama film directed and produced by Sonu Khatri with co-produced by Binod K Thakur, Sajan Ray and Bharat Sah under banner of "Pashupatinath Production". Pradeep Pandey "Chintu" in the leading role along with newcomer Nepali actress Shilpa Pokhrel. While Sonu Khatri, Akanksha Dubey, Dev Singh, Dhurba Koirala, Anoop Arora, Kalu Rana, Krishna Mahto and Tison Patel also appear in supporting roles.

Cast
 Pradeep Pandey Chintu as Shambhu
 Shilpa Pokhrel
 Sonu Khatri
 Akanksha Dubey
 Dev Singh
 Dhruba Koirala
 Anoop Arora
 Kalu Rana
 Krishna Mahto
 Tison Patel

Production
The script of Jay Shambhu was written by Ramesh Bogati, while dialogue was written by Veeru Thakur. The cinematography is by Hari Ghale Lama. Shishir Khati choreographed the dance numbers. Shree Shreshta directed the action and stunts in the film. Arjun Kece and Gopal Shah are the executive producers of the film and Aarav Khatri and Arjun Kee are the production designers. The soundtrack was composed by Rajnish Mishra, Om Jha, and Sudam Thapa while background music was scored by Om Sunar. Deepak and Manoj designed costumes for the entire cast. Publicity was designed by A Shree. Post-production was done by Motion Studio, and dubbing done in Eye Focus Studio.

Music
The soundtrack of this film is composed by Rajnish Mishra, Om Jha, and Sudam Thapa with lyrics penned by Uma Lal Yadav. It is produced under the "Worldwide Records Bhojpuri" Music company, who also bought his digital satellite rights.

References

Upcoming films
Upcoming Bhojpuri-language films